The Rover T16 engine was a  fuel injected DOHC inline-four petrol engine produced by Rover from 1992 to 1999. It is a development of the M series (M16), which was in turn a development of the O series, which dated back to the BMC B-series engine as found in the MG B and many others. Several variants were produced for various models, but all had the same displacement.

Applications
The Rover 620ti Turbo, 220 turbo coupé and 820 Vitesse all utilised the engine. The T-series engine also found its way into limited-run Rover 220 3-door hatchbacks in GTi and later GSi trims and the 420 GSI turbo and GSI Sport turbo. The T-series engine is a popular engine for engine conversions in to other Rover-MG vehicles i.e. MG ZR, MG ZS etc. It can also be adapted to a rear-wheel drive layout using a Rover LT77 or R380 transmission.

Naturally aspirated (NASP)
The non-turbo engine also found its way into the short-lived and generally underpowered Land Rover Discovery 2.0i. Land Rover also fitted the same engine to a special batch of Defenders built for the Italian Carabinieri, which operated an exclusively petrol-powered vehicle fleet. A development vehicle was also built using a turbocharged version of the engine which far out performed the V8 production cars, but no room could be found for it in Land Rover's vehicle strategy.

The engine produces 136bhp @ 6,000 rpm and 136lb/ft @ 2,500rpm of torque

Application:
1989–1998 Land Rover Discovery MPi 
1989–1998 Land Rover Defender MPi Italian Carabinieri 
1989–1995 Rover 220
1989–1995 Rover 420
1991–1999 Rover 820

Turbocharged
Rover introduced the turbocharged engine in 1992 with the Rover 220 Tomcat, making it the fastest Rover in production, the engine made 197bhp @ 6,100rpm, although the torque was electronically limited to 171 lb/ft @ 2,100rpm due to Rover's own PG1 gearbox not being able to cope with the amount of torque that the engine could produce. The engine is therefore electronically limited to a lower torque output than it is easily capable of, giving the engine a very 'flat' overall torque curve.

Application:
1989–1995 Rover 220 Turbo
1989–1995 Rover 420
1994–1999 Rover 620Ti
1991–1999 Rover 820 Vitesse

References 

T
Gasoline engines by model
Straight-four engines